Rayegan-e Sofla (also Romanized as Rāyegān-e Soflá; also known as Rāykān-e Soflá) is a village in Mohajeran Rural District, Lalejin District, Bahar County, Hamadan Province, Iran. At the 2006 census, its population was 656, in 123 families.

References 

Populated places in Bahar County